Varban Stamatov (27 May 1924 – 23 November 1998) was a Bulgarian writer, marine novelist, publicist and editor. The magnetism of the world's oceans and faraway lands were prominent features in his art.
He travelled extensively to as far as the Arctic circle, including the USA, China, Japan, Indonesia, Somalia, Egypt, Poland, Germany, Hungary, Italy, the former USSR, Armenia, England, France, gathering material for his publications.

Personal background 
Varban Stamatov was born 27 May 1924 in Veliko Turnovo, Bulgaria. He spent his childhood and youth in poverty in Varna and the surrounding villages. His mother, widowed young, was a teacher, who encouraged her children to read those "eternal books", essential as bread itself, literary works by authors such as Ivan Vazov, Dostoyevski, Jack London, Cervantes, Rabelais and Homer. As a student Varban spent hours in the local library studying ancient Greek, Latin, Russian and German which enabled him to support his family by helping other fellow students with their lessons. When he graduated from High School he was awarded a scholarship by the Ministry of Education. He was an excellent swimmer and won a local Varna championship for two consecutive years. He was in the final stages of World War II on the Fatherland Front as a war correspondent.

After the war Varban Stamatov studied medicine and philosophy at Sofia University. He worked as a journalist, later as editor, writing for newspapers such as  "Izgrev", "Literary Front", "Evening News", "National Culture", magazine "The Flame", publishers "Georgi Bakalov" (Varna) and  "Bulgarian Writer" (Sofia). Subsequently he wrote numerous novels on marine themes.  
When he was not at sea, he mostly lived and worked in Sofia, within a circle of Bulgarian intellectuals, dramatists, film directors, theatre producers, artists, composers, conductors, poets, literary editors, critics and authors. His colleagues and friends included Bancho Banov, Georges Tutev, Mladen Isaev, Emil Manov, Valeri Petrov, Nikolai Popov, Ducho Mundrov, Leda Mileva, (daughter of poet Geo Milev), Dora Gabe, Pavel Vezhinov and Boris Aprilov.

In Az-buki (1993) Georgi Tsankov comments on "In the Fog" as being "a literary work with huge factual and philosophical value". In "Plamuk" (1984) Bancho Banov says "Varban Stamatov isn't one of the praised writers... (ibid.) more importantly, he's one of the read writers". He was awarded a temporary home in Sopot, his author's mountain retreat at the foot of the majestic Balkan Mountains- Stara Planina. He shared this home with his third wife Fransi Kevork Bahchedzhian, pseudonym Sevda Sevan. Varban and Fransi spent 20 years together in Sofia and Ahtopol, near the Turkish border where they both wrote their best novels. He was a member of the Bulgarian Union of Writers . In his life he dreamt of escaping from the stifling city to venture out to the oceans, the eternal sway of waves, the vast expanse, the connection man makes with the eternal in himself. In his last novel he wrote: ″Each of us  who has been on this earth is a tiny enigma frequently unspoken for various reasons and is just a one-way passenger who comes and goes seldom leaving some tangible trail. All of us in the final reckoning, no matter how vain, are merely dust for the wind, to be blown about whilst yet alive along with all our absurd passions, misapprehensions, intolerances, manias for achieving justice, fears, tom-foolery....″ He died in Sofia, Bulgaria in 1998.

Published works 

 Soldier's Chronicles (1948)"
 Out of love short novel (1957)"
 The old boatswain narrates short stories for teenagers (1960)"
 The coast of the poor novel 1st ed.(1964), 2nd ed."Profizdat" Sofia (1989)"
 Anya (1967)
 Islanders Sofia (1968)
 Letters from the sea Sofia (1969–1984)
 The seal cub novelette for children Sofia (1969)
 Flagman 1st ed.(1972), 2nd ed. Vol.II Sofia "Bulgarian Writer" (1984)
 The Great Bitter Lake 1st ed.(1979), 2nd ed. Vol.I "Bulgarian Writer", (1984)
 Cricket on the Pole 1st ed.(1982), 2nd ed. "Bulgarian Writer" Sofia (1984)
 On a boat to Ararat c/o Jusautor Sofia "Profizdat" (1985)
 Death in Lauderdale, Sofia, "Bulgarian Writer" (1989)
 In the fog–the Bulgarian and the sea Sofia "Letopisi", (1992)
 Hostage and fugitive bound nowhere, Publisher "Fatherland", (1997) 
 Anthology-Bulgarian Marine Novelists, Varban Stamatov, Georgi Ingilizov, Emil Markov, Boris Aprilov, Atanas Stoichev, Jivko Angelov, Konstantin Ploshtakov, Kosta Radev, Nikola Radev, Peyu Bogdanov, Petar Kazalarski, Slavcho Chernishev, Tihomir Yordanov, Todor Velchev, Zvetan Minkov, Sofia University Publisher "St.Clement of Ochrid" (2002)

References

Further reading 
 ″Литературен Фронт″ 26 July 1984 Тодор Янчев ″Творчество, свързано с живота и морето″ Literary Front 26 July 1984, Todor Yanchev "Creativity connected with life and the sea" ″The sea and the ocean are symbols of the vast and the boundless, of the rigorous life, which the marine novelist deeply knows and loves. The essayistic manner of exposition in "Cricket on the Pole" brings cordiality to the images and represents a peculiar "moral biography of the author himself" ibid. "When we first met, the name Varban Stamatov was already on several book titles.  In 1960 his selected short stories for children and teenagers ("The old boatswain narrates") was published.  As a man, who even then displayed a particular interest in children's literature, I found a new stream in his stories, a new method towards the marine theme, as well as towards memories of the past.  Children's literature had a need for sincere and truthful words or, said succinctly, for realistic reading.  Just such an impression of profound and earnest realism was left at my first reading a book by Varban Stamatov.″
 Stamatov V., Hostage and fugitive Fatherland 1997 p. 40 ″И колкото да ми бе необяснимо отде, все по-нещо пестеше, заемаше отнякъде, запушваше 'дупки' и после връщаше на части само и само да ни купи на изплащане от пътуващите книжари по някоя от ония "вечни книги" според нея, нужни не по-малко от хляба-съчиненията на Вазов, Достоевски, Джек Лондон, Сервантес, Рабле, Омир″. (in translation- ″And in as much as it was inexplicable to me how or where she got it, she was always frugally sparing something, borrowing, filling up 'gaps' and then returning in parts what she owed, just so she could afford to buy us (in installments) one of those "eternal books", that according to her we needed as much as bread itself-the literary works of Ivan Vazov, Dostoyevski, Jack London, Cervantes, Rabelais, Homer.″
 ″Литературен Фронт″ 26 July 1984, Любомир Левчев, ″До Върбан Стаматов Тук″ София  Literaturen Front, 26 July 1984, Lyubomir Levchev, "Address to Varban Stamatov" Sofia ″Grown up in Veliko Turnovo and Varna, you participated in the Fatherland Front in World War II. Your initial manifestations in prose writing, "Soldier's Chronicles" and the novelette "Out of love" reflect the national struggle, paint the dismal images in the lives of dockers, of poor fishermen and sailors, tell an inspiring story of the birth of a new society. Your true vocation as a marine-novelist is shown in "The coast of the poor". The marine theme through your creativity is transformed into a part of the lives of the people, of their existence and contemporary aspirations. With special love you describe the sea and the work of those Bulgarian men, absent from home for months.  The mastery of this theme culminates in your novel "Flagman". There follow "Letters from the sea" and "The great bitter lake", testifying to the necessity for new forms of expressing complex problems, until we reach your new book, "Cricket on the Pole" – displaying creative maturity." ibid. "Your creative activity is inseparable from our socialist literary seal.  For many years you are an editor in the newspapers "Evening news", "Literature Front",  "National culture", in the literary journal "Plamuk".  Your work in publishers "Georgi Bakalov" – Varna, and "Bulgarian Writer" is an expression of your diligence.″
 "Азбуки" 5 май 1993,бр.18 Георги Цанков ″Озарения-Изповед след осмата лодка″, Az-buki 5 May 1993, Georgi Tsankov "Illuminations-Confessions after the 8th boat" "In the fog is a literary work of enormous factual and philosophical value. This is an effort to make sense of the Bulgarian character through the prism of maritime influence in the life of our people. The author, [Varban Stamatov] has turned upside down the libraries of Sofia, St.Petersburg, Warsaw, Berlin, Tbilisi, Rieka, London, Paris and Genoa, for decades gathering material, not missing any important publication on marine navigation whatsoever, and covering centuries of national history. He emerges before the reader's court with a subjective though hard to disprove theory. He tells inspiringly of the First and Second Bulgarian Kingdoms, yet quite generally his reasoning is at cross purposes with that of the history textbooks. Stamatov cannot be a bombastic, blinded patriot, he sees the megalomaniacal ambitions of our potentates who dreamt of overtaking Byzantium. He speaks with confidence of three centuries of bloodshedding wars, whose sole purpose had not been the defence of the native land. He examines them as a feature of bracing energy, as a will of state establishment and ambition to include more land for the Slavic people. Isn't it true, as in our past – since Tsar Samuil destroyed his brother Aaron's family, all the way to the "September Uprising" and "the people's law-court" –  that there has ever been the sinister sequence of fratricidal brawls, is it not true, that for eleven centuries we lived at the heart of the now extinct church cannon of Byzantium, of the re-introduced heresies, of the translated semi-scientific compilations within monastic-cell tuition.  The author does not bypass the frozen by canonical dictum restrictions in art and culture, but he discovers just one truly illuminated figure, that of the great John Exarch, author of the unique in breadth and volume work of enlightenment in Middle Ages Bulgaria, "The Six Days". Quite probably all the old 'pro-bulgarianists' will jump, and so will all the historians, but let them before that, think on the author's words: 'our Odyssey in history is from beginning to end without sea, without horizons, lacking thirst for discovering new worlds, without wandering warriors, merchants or seafaring travellers'."
 ″Пламък″ Май 1984, Банчо Банов, ″Овладяване на морската тема″ София Plamuk, May 1984, Bancho Banov, "Conquering the marine theme" Sofia. “Varban Stamatov isn't one of the praised writers. Furthermore, his name is comparatively seldom seen in literary articles or reviews.  I don’t  say this to reproach the critics.  I consider something else to be more important : he is one of the read writers.  Not only men at sea are reading him, those who can recognize themselves in his novels. His creative writing attracts much wider audience, who, in literature search the spirit of the times, truths about moving forward, about  the complicated transformation of the  human being. Naturally, the marine theme, if it can be called that, is the basis and prevalent in his books.  Having taken possession of him since the start of his path in literature,  she gradually widened her borders and reached ever greater depths.  From “Coast of the poor” through  to “Islanders”, “Flagman” and “The great bitter lake” to  “Cricket on the Pole” Varban Stamatov unfolded a previously unknown in our literature marine panorama, recreated a new, unresearched by no one else reality in the life of the Bulgarian man. “  ibid.  “If in “Flagman” the field of action is deliberately restricted to only the ship’s deck, the “Great bitter lake” is a novel about the contemporary Bulgarian sailor, placed at the centre of the greatest and most turbulent on earth tremors.  The rich and complex composition affords the author a freedom to direct his characters to hot spots on the planet everywhere, where a battle is raging against violence and evil.  In the novel , the linear annotations of the plot are oddly intertwined and connected.  They run in two dimensions:  in actual reality-on the old trough, anchored in the Suez Canal during the Israeli aggression, and, in the imaginary, desired world of the characters – experienced in the contra-revolution in Chile, in the victory of the African nations, in the massacres in Indonesia, and who knows where else.  This compositional decision has enabled Stamatov to describe to the greatest degree the mentality and soul of his heroes, to reveal their insight into the revolutionary pulse of the times, their  solidarity towards each justified human act, and their dedication.”
 Stamatov V., Hostage and fugitive Fatherland 1997 p. 7 ″Всеки, живял на земята, е една малка тайна, най-често неизказана по ред причини, само един пътник, който идва и си отива, много рядко оставяйки подире си някакава реална следа. В последна сметка всички до един, при цялата си суетност, сме само прах за вятъра, за да бъдем най-често още приживе ответи заедно с всичките си смешни пристрастия, нетърпимости, мании за правота, страхове, ахмачество...″ ″Each of us who has been on this earth, is a tiny enigma frequently unspoken for various reasons, and is just a one-way passenger who comes and goes seldom leaving some tangible trail. All of us in the final reckoning, no matter how vain, are merely dust for the wind, to be blown about whilst yet alive along with all our absurd passions, misapprehensions, intolerances, manias for achieving justice, fears, foolery...″

External links 

 http://berberian11.tripod.com/hayrabedjan_armenians.htm
 http://webmonitor.fyxm.net/www.helikon.bg
 http://www.collectorfamily.com/book.php?pageNum_rsBooks=4
 http://www.collectorfamily.com/book.php?
 http://www.posadskydvor.ru/colon.php?id=562
 http://www.kubon-sagner.de/opac.html?filter...mode=refine&sort=1
 http://www.panarmenian.net/eng/world/news/31717/

1924 births
1998 deaths
Bulgarian writers
People from Veliko Tarnovo